Dykebar  was a railway station in the Dykebar area to the south of Paisley, Renfrewshire, Scotland. The station was originally part of the Paisley and Barrhead District Railway . The line was opened in 1897 and used by coal trains until the 1960s but none of the stations including this one opened for passenger travel.

It was situated on the east boundary of what are now the grounds of St Andrews school around 200 yards along Hawkhead Road from its junction with Barrhead Road. The remains of a bridge can still be seen at the pedestrian crossing at that location (next to the entrance of Dobbie's Garden Centre) 
. The station was converted to a two-room and kitchen house before being dismantled by vandals in the late 1960s. The line through Dykebar from Blackbyres to Paisley East goods closed on 31 December 1960.

Railway photographer Norris Forrest visited the area in February 1960 taking pictures of the station platform, a passenger shelter and a train. By observing Ross House (which is still there) behind the shelter it is possible to pinpoint the original position of the station. There is no sign of the concrete platform today, the only structure on the site being a wall. Other railway artifacts can be seen on the satellite image in the adjoining field including a bridge which would have taken trains into Hawkhead Hospital. St. Andrews school is in the background.

Notes
The Norris Forrest photographs are the copyright of the Great North of Scotland Railway Association.

External links

External links
Another photograph of the station.
Dedicated web page

References
 Canadian National Magazine By Canadian National Railways V. 40, no. 12 (January  1955)

Disused railway stations in Renfrewshire
Unbuilt railway stations in the United Kingdom
Buildings and structures in Paisley, Renfrewshire
Transport in Paisley, Renfrewshire